Bobrovytsia Raion  was a raion (district) of Chernihiv Oblast, northern Ukraine. Its administrative centre was located at the city of Bobrovytsia. The raion was abolished on 18 July 2020 as part of the administrative reform of Ukraine, which reduced the number of raions of Chernihiv Oblast to five. The area of Bobrovytsia Raion was merged into Nizhyn Raion. The last estimate of the raion population was 

At the time of disestablishment, the raion consisted of two hromadas:
 Bobrovytsia urban hromada with the administration in Bobrovytsia;
 Nova Basan rural hromada with the administration in the selo of Nova Basan.

References 

Former raions of Chernihiv Oblast
1923 establishments in Ukraine
Ukrainian raions abolished during the 2020 administrative reform